Miramar (Spanish for "Sea View") is a district located within the city limits of Half Moon Bay in San Mateo County, California.  Miramar Beach is located at Miramar. The east side of Highway 1 and north of the middle of Mirada road is in unincorporated San Mateo County.

References

Half Moon Bay, California
Neighborhoods in San Mateo County, California
Populated coastal places in California